The Ethiopian Purple Heart is a medal of the Federal Republic of Ethiopia similar to U.S. Purple Heart, which is given to military personnel wounded during a war action. 

The medal is heart-shaped; in the center of the heart there are two crossed swords on a red background. Above the heart there is a suspension bar with the inscription "wounded in action" in Amharic language on a green background. The ribbon of the medal is red.

External links
OMSA medal database-Federal Republic of Ethiopia

Orders, decorations, and medals of Ethiopia